Hello, Fools! is a 1996 Russian film directed by Eldar Ryazanov. The film is a fantastical melodrama and comedy.

Plot
Jura Kablukov is a cheerful, kind, but very unlucky man. He works as a cleaner of historical monuments in Moscow, together with his friend, Fedor, a folk craftsman, who is spoiled with women's attention. Kablukov is divorced and his ex-wife, Svetlana, a millionaire manager of a fashion agency, wants to evict him from their apartment.

Some time ago Kablukov had a strange dream: he, Jura Kablukov, is the French jeweler Auguste Derulen, who lives with his wife, beautiful Polina in Moscow during the October Revolution. On the eve of a search (equivalent to a brazen robbery) committed by "revolutionary" soldiers and sailors, Auguste and Polina hide gold and jewelry into a statue adorning the walls of their apartment.

Soon an even more strange event comes to pass. Jura meets with Ksenia, a sweet and kind but very absentminded girl. Ksenia is losing vision catastrophically fast, and because of this, constantly lands into trouble. Ksenia is similar to the jeweler's wife out Jura's dream, and it soon becomes clear that she is a descendant of the Derulen family.

Thus it appears that Jura's dream was prophetic; the events he experienced in the dream truly took place many years ago. On the advice of Fedor, Kablukov's experienced friend, the buddies begin to search for treasures that are still immured in the statue, which is located in Ksenia's apartment.

Cast
 Tatyana Drubich as Ksenia Zasypkina/Polina Derulen 
 Slava Polunin as Jura Kablukov/Auguste Derulen (voice by Andrey Myagkov)
 Tatyana Dogileva as Svetlana, the former Jura Kablukov's wife, a millionaire
 Boris Shcherbakov as Fedor, driver, gunner and folk craftsman
 Alexander Schirvindt as leader of the Social-Socialist party, is a clear parody of both Gennady Zyuganov and Vladimir Zhirinovsky
 Olga Volkova as  ophthalmologist
 Vyacheslav Kulakov as Tolik, Svetlana's driver
 Aleksandr Pashutin as drunk revolutionary officer from Jura Kablukov's dream
 Andrey Smolyakov as Volodya, bodyguard
 Sergey Stepanchenko as Stepan, bodyguard
 Anatoliy Rudenko  as Mitrofan, Jura Kablukov's son (acting debut)
 Ruslan Akhmetov as customer
 Alexey Buldakov as foreman from Ukraine
 Nikolai Garo as Ksenia Zasypkina's unlucky admirer
 Nikita Pomerantcev as Ksenia Zasypkina's unlucky admirer
 Yan Tsapnik as real estate agent
 Eldar Ryazanov as Nikolai Timofeyevich, director of the bookstore

Facts
The film was banned in Ukraine because Jan Tsapnik was declared as a danger to the country.

References

External links

1997 films
1996 romantic comedy films
1990s Russian-language films
Russian romantic comedy films
Films directed by Eldar Ryazanov